John Anthony Hackenbruck (October 20, 1915 – October 26, 1988) was an American football player. 

A native of The Dalles, Oregon, Thomas attended The Dalles High School and then played college football as a tackle for Oregon State from 1936 to 1939. He was selected as a captain on the 1939 team.

In December 1939, he was selected by the Detroit Lions with the 156th pick in the 1940 NFL Draft. He signed with the Lions in April 1940. He appeared in seven games for the Lions as a tackle during the 1940 season.

References

1915 births
1988 deaths
American football tackles
Oregon State Beavers football players
Detroit Lions players
Players of American football from Oregon